Adber (formerly Eatan) is a hamlet in Dorset, England. It is known as Ateberie in the Domesday Book.

Adber has no church. Its position affords fine views over the county of Somerset.

References

External links
 
 

Villages in Dorset
Places formerly in Somerset